Dalhousie Assembly constituency is one of the 68 assembly constituencies of Himachal Pradesh a northern Indian state. Dalhousie is also part of Kangra Lok Sabha constituency.

Members of Legislative Assembly

Election candidate

2022

Election results

2017

See also
 Dalhousie (disambiguation)
 Chamba district
 Kangra Lok Sabha constituency

References

External links
 

Chamba district
Assembly constituencies of Himachal Pradesh